Proto-Pama–Nyungan is the hypothetical common ancestor of the Pama–Nyungan languages. It may have been spoken as recently as about 5,000 years ago, much more recently than the 40,000 to 60,000 years indigenous Australians are believed to have been inhabiting Australia.

Evolution
How the Pama–Nyungan languages spread over most of the continent and displaced any pre-Pama–Nyungan languages is uncertain; one possibility is that language could have been transferred from one group to another alongside culture and ritual. Given the relationship of cognates between groups, it seems that Pama-Nyungan has many of the characteristics of a sprachbund, indicating the antiquity of multiple waves of culture contact between groups. Dixon in particular has argued that the genealogical trees found with many language families do not fit in the Pama-Nyungan family.

Using computational phylogenetics, Bouckaert, et al. (2018) posit a mid-Holocene expansion of Pama-Nyungan from the Gulf Plains of northeastern Australia.

Phonology
Proto-Pama–Nyungan's phonological inventory, as reconstructed by Barry Alpher (2004), is quite similar to those of most present-day Australian languages.

Vowels

Vowel length is contrastive only in the first (i.e. stressed) syllable in a word.

Consonants

Proto-Pama–Nyungan seems to have had only one set of laminal consonants; the two contrasting sets (lamino-dental and lamino-alveopalatal or "palatal") found in some present-day languages can largely be explained as innovations resulting from conditioned sound changes.

Nevertheless, there are a small number of words in which an alveolo-palatal stop is found where a dental would be expected, and these are written *cʲ. There is no convincing evidence, however, of an equivalent nasal *ɲʲ or lateral *ʎʲ.

Pronouns
Reconstructed Proto-Pama–Nyungan pronouns from Alpher (2004):

{| class="wikitable sortable"
! gloss !! Proto-Pama-Nyungan
|-
| 1 Sg Dir. Object || *ngañi, *ngaña
|-
| 1 Sg Oblique || *ngacu(+)
|-
| 1 Sg Oblique || *ngaca+
|-
| 2 Sg || *ñuntu
|-
| you SG OBL || *ñuna
|-
| we EXnonSg || *ngana
|-
| we INDU || *ngali
|-
| you PL || *ñurra
|-
| they DU || *pula
|-
| they PL || *cana
|}

Vocabulary
Reconstructed Proto-Pama–Nyungan vocabulary and morphemes from Alpher (2004):

{| class="wikitable sortable"
! gloss !! Proto-Pama-Nyungan
|-
| (ablative, elative) suffix or postposition || *nguru
|-
| acacia (sp.) || *wirlu
|-
| alive || *kunka
|-
| all || *muku
|-
| anger || *kuli
|-
| ankle || *nuka
|-
| another || *wiːya
|-
| auntie || *mayi
|-
| away || *yarra ~ *yirra
|-
| back || *mutu/a
|-
| beard || *ngarnka
|-
| behind || *kurri
|-
| belly (inside) || *walngka
|-
| big || *purlka
|-
| bird sp: frogmouth || *tawa ~ *tawu
|-
| bite || *paca- ~ *paca-
|-
| black || *ngulcu
|-
| bone || *muku
|-
| bottom || *mangka
|-
| bream (sp.) || *lipa-
|-
| breast || *ngamun
|-
| by and by || *ngula
|-
| cavity || *lumpu
|-
| cheek || *walu
|-
| child (to woman), sister's child || *cuwa ~ *cuway
|-
| clean || *taːrrkal
|-
| cold || *mica
|-
| cook in earth oven || *kaːmpa-
|-
| cooked food || *mucya
|-
| cousin || *maːri
|-
| cry || *rungka-
|-
| damage || *ruwa-/i-
|-
| dig || *paːnga-
|-
| dig || *paka-
|-
| digging stick || *kana
|-
| drink || *kuñcya-
|-
| drink || *luka-
|-
| dry || *lalka
|-
| eat || *mungka-
|-
| excrement || *kuna
|-
| eye || *kuru
|-
| fall || *kaːlka/i-
|-
| fall || *wanti- ~ *wanta-
|-
| fast || *kalmpa
|-
| father's sister || *piːmu
|-
| fish || *kuya/u
|-
| flame || *yalyu
|-
| foot || *cama
|-
| foot || *cina
|-
| forehead || *ngulu
|-
| ghost || *wangarr
|-
| green pygmy goose || *tiwa+
|-
| ground || *taːku
|-
| hand || *mara
|-
| having || *+mirri
|-
| heart || *lulku
|-
| here || *ñaka
|-
| hip || *pirlu
|-
| hit || *paca- (?)
|-
| hold together || *karrpi- ~ *karrpa-
|-
| I || *ngayu ~ *ngayi ~ *ngaya
|-
| later || *ngaka
|-
| laugh || *cangkar(V)
|-
| lay (egg), give birth to (young) || *ngaːci- ~ *ngaːca-
|-
| left hand || *caku
|-
| lick || *pila-
|-
| lick || *pina
|-
| louse || *kulu/i
|-
| moon || *kakara
|-
| moon (full) || *pira
|-
| mother || *ngama
|-
| mother's brother || *ngami(r)ni
|-
| mother's father || *ngaci
|-
| mother's mother || *kami
|-
| mother's older brother || *mukur
|-
| mouth || *caː
|-
| mouth || *caːwa/u
|-
| mud || *curlpi
|-
| nasal mucus || *ngu(ː)rrci
|-
| neck || *manu
|-
| nose || *kuːwu
|-
| nose || *ngurru
|-
| not || *kari
|-
| one || *kuma
|-
| pearlshell || *piːrra
|-
| pierce || *ka(r)li-
|-
| pigeon (sp.) || *laparr
|-
| pull || *purra-/i-
|-
| pus, matter || *ci(ː)ci
|-
| put || *wanta- ~ *wanti-
|-
| put || *wunpa/i-
|-
| rat || *kalu
|-
| rotten || *puka
|-
| saltpan || *pacirri
|-
| sand || *curtu
|-
| sandfly || *lañirri
|-
| scratch, scrape || *wiːrrngka-
|-
| seagull || *cyarra
|-
| see || *ña(ː)-
|-
| shade || *malu
|-
| shell, bivalve (sp.) || *wirti
|-
| shin || *yangkara
|-
| sickness || *wanci
|-
| singe it || *wita-
|-
| sister (older) || *yapa
|-
| sit || *ñiːna-
|-
| smell || *ñuːma-
|-
| some || *wapu
|-
| sore || *wiːthi
|-
| speak || *wangka- (?)
|-
| spear || *kalka
|-
| spear || *laːma- ~ *raːma- ~ *taːma-
|-
| spear || *ra-
|-
| stand it up || *carra-
|-
| stick || *ci(ː)rni
|-
| sting || *raca-
|-
| taboo || *ngalñca
|-
| tail || *mulu
|-
| take || *maː-
|-
| termite mound || *tipa
|-
| there || *pala
|-
| thigh || *carra
|-
| to wet (something) || *kiñca-
|-
| together || *turnu
|-
| tongue || *calañ
|-
| tongue || *ngañcar
|-
| tooth || *rirra ~ *lirra
|-
| turn || *wirni-
|-
| two || *kucyarra ~ *kucarra
|-
| urine || *kañcyi
|-
| urine || *kumpu
|-
| vegetable food || *mayi
|-
| water || *nguku ~ *nguki
|-
| what || *miña
|-
| what || *ngaːni
|-
| where || *wañca
|-
| who || *waːri ~ *waːra
|-
| wife's mother's brother || *caːmi
|-
| wind || *waːrlpa
|-
| wing || *marra
|-
| woman || *kapi+
|-
| woman || *yipi 
|}

In addition to Hale's 1982 list of words unique to Pama–Nyungan, and in addition to pronouns and case endings they reconstruct for the proto-language, Evans and McConvell report that while some of their roots are implausible, O'Grady and Tryon, nevertheless provide "hundreds of clear cognate sets with attestations throughout the Pama–Nyungan area and absent outside."

References

External links

Chirila – Yale Pama-Nyungan Lab

Pama–Nyungan languages
Pama-Nyungan